Neresheim is a town in the Ostalbkreis district, in Baden-Württemberg, Germany.
It's the home of the Neresheim Abbey, which still hosts monks, was Reichsfrei until the German Mediatisation and was built by Balthasar Neumann. Another notable touristic attraction is the heritage railway Härtsfeldbahn.

Neresheim is listed on the Arc de Triomphe in Paris, France, along with 95 other sites of battles won by the French army.

Born in Neresheim 
 Oscar F. Mayer (1859–1955), founder of the Oscar Mayer meat production company, was born in Kösingen, today a borough of Neresheim.
 Andreas Zeyer (born 1968), retired German football player
 Michael Zeyer (born 1968), retired German football player
 Karl Bonhoeffer (1868–1948), psychiatrist and neurologist, father of theologian Dietrich Bonhoeffer

References 

Towns in Baden-Württemberg
Ostalbkreis
Württemberg